The 2012–13 TVL Premier League or 2012–13 Port Vila Premier League is the 19th season of the Port Vila Premier League top division.

The top three of the league qualify for the 2013 VFF National Super League.

The season lasted from September 13 to December 12, 2012.

Amicale FC were the champions and Seveners United relegated to the 2013–14 TVL First Division.

Teams 
 Amicale FC
 Erakor Golden Star
 Ifira Black Bird
 Seveners United
 Shepherds United
 Spirit 08
 Tafea FC
 Tupuji Imere

Standings

References

External links
 

Port Vila Football League seasons
2012–13 in Vanuatuan football
Port
Port